The 5th European Short Course Championships was held December 13–16, 2001 at the Wezenberg Swimming Pool in Antwerp, Belgium. The meet featured competition in a short course (25m) pool.

Results

Men's events

Women's events

Medal table

External links
Results book

European Short Course
S
2001
S
S
European Short Course Swimming Championships
European Short Course Swimming Championships